Luka Koberidze (born 9 September 1994) is a Georgian professional footballer who plays as a midfielder for Marijampolė City.

Career
Koberidze is a product of the FC Baia Zugdidi academy and played in the Georgian Erovnuli Liga until January 2016.

Desna Chernihiv
In 2016 he signed a three-year contract with Desna Chernihiv in the Ukrainian First League. With Desna he won the 2017–18 Ukrainian First League. After a disagreement with the player, the club decided not to extend his contract.

Metalist 1925 Kharkiv and Torpedo Kutaisi
In April 2019 he moved to Metalist 1925 Kharkiv in the Ukrainian First League, making only seven appearances before moving to Torpedo Kutaisi in the same season.

Shevardeni-1906 Tbilisi and VPK-Ahro Shevchenkivka
In 2020, Koberidze signed with Shevardeni-1906 Tbilisi for half a season, making 12 appearances. On 29 January 2021, though, he moved to VPK-Ahro Shevchenkivka in the Ukrainian First League. On 25 October he scored against Hirnyk-Sport Horishni Plavni.

Sioni Bolnisi
In April 2022 he moved to Georgian side Sioni Bolnisi in the Erovnuli Liga. On 14 April he made his debut against Torpedo Kutaisi at the Tamaz Stepania Stadium in Bolnisi.

Riteriai
In summer 2022, he moved to Riteriai in A Lyga for the 2022 season.

Marijampolė City
In February 2023 he moved to Marijampolė City.

Career statistics

Club

Honours
Desna Chernihiv
 Ukrainian First League: 2017–18

References

External links
 
 
 Profile at VPK-Ahro Shevchenkivka 

1994 births
Living people
Footballers from Tbilisi
Footballers from Georgia (country)
Expatriate footballers from Georgia (country)
Erovnuli Liga players
FC Zugdidi players
FC Guria Lanchkhuti players
FC Desna Chernihiv players
FC Metalist 1925 Kharkiv players
FC Torpedo Kutaisi players
FC Shevardeni-1906 Tbilisi players
FC VPK-Ahro Shevchenkivka players
FC Sioni Bolnisi players
FK Riteriai players
Marijampolė City players
Ukrainian Premier League players
Ukrainian First League players
A Lyga players
I Lyga players
Expatriate footballers in Ukraine
Expatriate footballers in Lithuania
Expatriate sportspeople from Georgia (country) in Ukraine
Expatriate sportspeople from Georgia (country) in Lithuania
Association football midfielders